This is a list of the largest planned renewable energy projects rated by proposed generating capacity (larger than 5 GW).

References

Renewable energy
Planned